The Slow Empire is a BBC Books original novel written by Dave Stone and based on the long-running British science fiction television series Doctor Who. It features the Eighth Doctor, Fitz and Anji.

Popular culture allusions
This novel has a number of allusions to popular culture:
Anji has consecutively watched every episode of Quantum Leap due to her boyfriend, Dave.
A small screen graphic of the TARDIS is described as having a "video echo effect from a 1970s Top of the Pops."
The several console terminals on the planet Goronos reminded Anji of that film done by the man who did Time Bandits and was originally going to be titled 1984 and a Half.

Continuity
The man who wakes Anji has been confirmed to be Sabbath in disguise
The Collectors also appeared in Heart of TARDIS  and Sky Pirates!.

References

External links
The Cloister Library - The Slow Empire

2001 British novels
2001 science fiction novels
Eighth Doctor Adventures
British science fiction novels
Novels by Dave Stone